John Markham may refer to:
John Markham (judge), English judge
John Markham (Royal Navy officer) (1761–1827), British admiral
Johnny Markham (1908–1975), American baseball player
John Markham (died 1559), MP for Nottinghamshire (UK Parliament constituency) and Nottingham